The Johanna Sebus Gymnasium was a school in the city of Kleve which closed in 2010 due to low enrollment. It merged with Freiherr von Stein Gymnasium. The school was founded in 1935. Up until 1978 the school was a girls school.

References 

Kleve
Defunct schools in Germany
Gymnasiums in Germany
Schools in North Rhine-Westphalia
1935 establishments in Germany
2010 disestablishments in Germany